Cerithiella astrolabiensis is a species of very small sea snail, a marine gastropod mollusk in the family Newtoniellidae. It was described by Watson in 1880.

Description 
The maximum recorded shell length is 11.5 mm.

Habitat 
Minimum recorded depth is 95 m. Maximum recorded depth is 298 m.

References

 Engl W. (2012) Shells of Antarctica. Hackenheim: Conchbooks. 402 pp.

Newtoniellidae
Gastropods described in 1908